Hyalomma brevipunctata, or Sharif's Indian hyalomma, is a hard-bodied tick of the family Ixodidae. It is found in India and Sri Lanka.

Parasitism
It is an obligate ectoparasite of mammals such as cattle, goats, buffaloes, dogs, camels. Rare specimens were collected from humans, blue bull, sambar, and spotted deer. It is a potential vector of Kyasanur Forest disease virus.

Description
Male has comma-shaped spiracular plates. Female has an elongate, oval operculum.

References

External links
 

Ticks
Ixodidae
Arachnids of Asia
Arthropods of India
Arthropods of Sri Lanka
Animals described in 1928